Andrej Mészáros is a Slovak para table tennis player who competes at international table tennis competitions. He is a two-time European bronze medalist and World bronze medalist in the team events with Peter Mihálik. He has also competed at the 2008 and 2012 Summer Paralympics.

References

1975 births
Living people
Sportspeople from Dunajská Streda
Paralympic table tennis players of Slovakia
Table tennis players at the 2008 Summer Paralympics
Table tennis players at the 2012 Summer Paralympics
Slovak male table tennis players